The 2004 Great Yarmouth Borough Council election took place on 10 June 2004 to elect members of Great Yarmouth Borough Council in Norfolk, England. The whole council was up for election with boundary changes since the last election in 2003 reducing the number of seats by 9. The Conservative Party stayed in overall control of the council.

Election result

Ward results

References

2004 English local elections
2004
2000s in Norfolk